The Edwin Grant Conklin Medal was inaugurated in 1995 by the Society for Developmental Biology in honor of the biologist Edwin Conklin. It is awarded annually to recognise a member of the society who has carried out distinguished and sustained research in developmental biology. The recipient delivers a feature lecture at the annual society meeting and is presented with a commemorative plaque.

List of recipients
The following have won the award:

 1995 – John Phillip Trinkaus (Yale University)
 1996 – John W. Saunders Jr. (State University of New York at Albany)
 1997 – Elizabeth D. Hay (Harvard Medical School)
 1998 – Thomas C. Kaufman (Indiana University)
 1999 – Clement Markert (Yale University)
 2000 – Charles B. Kimmel (University of Oregon)
 2001 – John B. Gurdon (University of Cambridge)
 2002 – Gail R. Martin (University of California, San Francisco)
 2003 – Allan C. Spradling (Carnegie Institution of Washington, Baltimore, Maryland)
 2004 – Matthew Scott (Stanford University)
 2005 – Nicole Marthe Le Douarin (Honoraire at the Collège de France and Secrétaire Perpétuelle of the Académie des Sciences de l'Institut de France)
 2006 – Trudi Schupbach (Princeton University)
 2007 – Janet Rossant (Hospital for Sick Children, Toronto, Canada)
 2008 – Elizabeth J. Robertson (University of Oxford, United Kingdom)
 2009 – David Mark Kingsley (Stanford University)
 2010 – Noriyuki Satoh (Okinawa Institute of Science & Technology, Japan)
 2011 – Ruth Lehmann (Skirball Institute of Biomolecular Medicine, NYU School of Medicine, Howard Hughes Medical Institute)
 2012 – Clifford Tabin (Department of Genetics, Harvard Medical School, Boston, Massachusetts)
 2013 – Marianne Bronner (California Institute of Technology)
 2014 – Richard Harland (University of California, Berkeley)
 2015 – Michael S. Levine (University of California, Berkeley / Lewis Sigler Institute, Princeton)
 2016 - Kathryn V. Anderson (Sloan Kettering Institute)
 2017 - Philippe M. Soriano (Icahn School of Medicine at Mount Sinai)
 2018 - Robb Krumlauf (Stowers Institute for Medical Research)
 2019 - Eric N. Olson (University of Texas Southwestern Medical Center)
 2020 - Claude Desplan (New York University)

See also 

 List of biology awards
 List of medicine awards
 List of prizes named after people

References

Biology awards
Medicine awards
Awards established in 1995